Noch may refer to:

Noch (model railroads), a model railroad company
Noch (album), a 1986 album by Kino
Noch, Iran, a village in Mazandaran Province, Iran
"Noch" (song), a 1984 song by David Tukhmanov